The Late Piano Sonatas usually refer to the last set of piano sonatas a composer has composed during his late years or while nearing death. They may refer to:
 Ludwig van Beethoven's late piano sonatas
 Franz Schubert's last three piano sonatas